Paige Kelton is a former investigative reporter and Special Projects Manager on Action News Jax' at WJAX-TV/WFOX-TV in Jacksonville, Florida. Previously she anchored all evening newscasts (5, 5:30, 6, 11 on WJAX-TV and an hour-long 10 p.m. newscast on WFOX-TV).

Early life
Kelton was raised in San Francisco, California. She studied telecommunications and journalism, earning her degree from Chico State University. While attending the university, she was employed by National Public Radio.

Biography
She worked as an anchor and reporter in Nebraska, including at KOLN-TV in Lincoln. Kelton has received 8 Emmy nominations, and was awarded the Emmy for Excellence in crime reporting and evening newscast. She was honored by the Florida AP Broadcasters Association for Individual Achievement and received The Edward R. Murrow Award for hard news. She joined WAWS(TV) (now WFOX-TV) in 1996 as an anchor, and began anchoring on sister station WTEV-TV (now WJAX-TV) in 2002.

For most of her career at the Jacksonville duopoly, she anchored CBS 47 News at 6 and Fox 30 News at 10. However, when WTEV-TV and WAWS(TV) rebranded into one brand known as Action News'', she was promoted to Special Projects Manager.

External links
 Action News Paige Kelton Bio

References

American television journalists
American women television journalists
Living people
Television anchors from Jacksonville, Florida
Year of birth missing (living people)
21st-century American women